Metallurg was a professional bandy club in Bratsk, Russia founded in 2000. Metallurg played their matches at Metallurg Stadium and folded in 2008.

In the 2004–05 Russian Bandy League, Metallurg advanced to the play-offs, but lost to Vodnik in the Round of 16.

References

Bandy clubs in Russia
Bandy clubs established in 2000
2000 establishments in Russia